Krzysztof Baran (born 26 July 1960, in Warsaw) is a former Polish footballer/soccer player. Besides Poland, he has played in Greece.

Club career
Baran began his career with Gwardia Warszawa, a club for whom he would play several seasons in the Polish Ekstraklasa. He had a spell with Larissa in the Greek First Division.

International career
Baran made 10 appearances for the senior Poland national football team from 1981 to 1987.

He played for Poland at the 1979 FIFA World Youth Championship in Japan.

References

1960 births
Living people
Polish footballers
Poland youth international footballers
Poland international footballers
Polish expatriate footballers
Ekstraklasa players
Super League Greece players
Gwardia Warsaw players
ŁKS Łódź players
Górnik Zabrze players
Athlitiki Enosi Larissa F.C. players
Expatriate footballers in Greece
Footballers from Warsaw
Association football forwards
Poland under-21 international footballers